Paul Richard Buckler (born 6 December 1955) is an English musician who is the former drummer of The Jam.

Early years
Buckler was born in the town of Woking in the county of Surrey, England. He received his education at Sheerwater Secondary School, in Woking. Whilst there in the early 1970s, he joined other pupils in a newly formed band named The Jam.

The Jam
He was the drummer for The Jam from its formation in the early 1970s through to its break up in the early 1980s, during which time it became a critically acclaimed and commercially successful rock band with an original sound as part of the mod revival movement in England's music and fashion scenes of the period.

Although the band's creative output came to be attributed primarily to its singer/guitarist Paul Weller, its rhythm section of Buckler and Bruce Foxton (bass guitar) were integral to its sound, and in retrospect Buckler felt that Weller had been given undue credit for the band's song catalogue to the detriment of its other members' contributions.

The band broke up at the behest of Weller in 1982, and Buckler and Weller - apart from a brief greeting exchanged in passing at a chance meeting - have not spoken to one another since.

Later career
In 1983, Buckler set up a new band entitled Time UK, featuring himself on drums, Jimmy Edwards and Ray Simone, Danny Kustow, and the bassist Martin Gordon. Gordon's tenure was brief – he recorded demos and performed only one gig with the band before being replaced by Nick South. Time UK sold nearly 6,000 copies of their first single release "The Cabaret".

In the mid-1980s, Buckler briefly reunited with his former Jam bandmate Bruce Foxton, and with Jimmy Edwards they performed in a new band called Sharp, recording some new songs for the short-lived Unicorn record label. These recordings were subsequently reissued on a Time UK anthology release.

After Time UK broke up, Buckler moved into production, running a studio in Islington, working on the album Bound for Glory by The Highliners (which he also drummed for briefly in 1990). He was also involved in the production of the debut album of The Family Cat, Tell 'Em We're Surfin (1989).

In the mid-1990s, Buckler abandoned professional music and went into business as an ad hoc carpenter, fashioning cabinets and 'distressed' furniture in Woking, Surrey.

In November 2005, Buckler re-entered professional music when he set up a new band called The Gift, named after the final album release by The Jam, with Russell Hastings (lead vocals/guitar) and Dave Moore (Bass), with himself on drums, playing exclusively old material from The Jam's back catalogue. In 2007, Bruce Foxton joined as the bass-player (Moore moving to rhythm guitar and keyboards) and the new band began touring under the name of From the Jam. After four years of touring, Buckler quit From the Jam in September 2009, being replaced by Mark Brzezicki. Criticism of the new act from a distance by Paul Weller confirmed that it was not going to be a means of a reformation of the original band, and Buckler felt that to continue performing with it without Weller, ran the risk of him and Foxton finding themselves in the situation of becoming a Jam tribute band.

In 2011, Buckler joined a short-lived new band named 'If' as its drummer, with Tim V from Sham 69 on vocals, and Ian Whitewood on 'second drums', Tony Feedback on guitar and Al Campbell on bass.

In July 2012, Buckler ceremonially unveiled an oak wood abstract art sculpture by Richard Heys, entitled "The Space Between", on the Guildford Road in Woking, commissioned at a cost of £45,000 by Woking Borough Council to commemorate The Jam in the band's home town.

In 2013, Buckler moved into a management consultancy role for number of new musical acts, including singer-guitarist Sarah Jane, and the band 'The Brompton Mix'.

Buckler's autobiography, entitled That's Entertainment: My Life in The Jam, was published in 2015 by Omnibus Press.

Personal life
Buckler and his wife Lesley live in Woking, with two children, Jason (born 1986) and Holly (born 1993). Since leaving The Jam he has authored several publications on the act's history.

Publications
 The Jam: Our Story (1994)
 The Jam Unseen (2007)
 That's Entertainment: My Life in The Jam (2015)
 Dead Straight Guide to The Jam (2017)
 The Start to '77 (2017) 
 This Day in Music's Guide to The Jam (2018)

References

External links
The Jam Fan (official website edited by Rick Buckler)
Interview with Rick Bucker for Mudkiss
2013 video interview with Buckler

1955 births
British male drummers
English punk rock drummers
English rock drummers
English autobiographers
Living people
People from Woking
The Jam members
Mod revival musicians